To Be Taught, if Fortunate is a 2019 science fiction novella by Becky Chambers. 


Development
Chambers wrote the novel out of a desire to see "real people" centered in a narrative that takes place in space, as science fiction generally focuses on what she refers to as "the elite".

The title phrase comes from the opening audio recording on the Voyager Golden Record, spoken by Kurt Waldheim, Secretary-General of the United Nations, and launched into space in 1977:

I send greetings on behalf of the people of our planet. We step out of our solar system into the universe seeking only peace and friendship, to teach if we are called upon, to be taught if we are fortunate. We know full well that our planet and all its inhabitants are but a small part of the immense universe that surrounds us and it is with humility and hope that we take this step.

Synopsis
To Be Taught, if Fortunate follows four astronauts as they travel beyond the Solar System on a research mission to document extraterrestrial life on four planets. The explorers are put into suspended animation for extended periods of time while they travel between the planets. The book chronicles their adventures and explores how they decide what is important to them. As they leave the second planet, they realize that they have received no communication from Earth for months; as they arrive at the fourth, they receive a message indicating that a natural disaster has crippled Earth's technological capability, rendering them potentially the last astronauts. They decide to send a message back to Earth to ask whether they should return as planned, or head outward to explore more planets; if they never receive an answer, they will remain in suspended animation indefinitely.

Reception
Emily VanDerWerff, writing for Vox, praised the novella as a "quick read [...] but ultimately a rewarding one, as it considers what it is that makes us human on both an individual and a collective level".

Awards and accolades
The novella was nominated for the Hugo Award for Best Novella in 2020.

References

Works by Becky Chambers
2019 science fiction novels
Hodder & Stoughton books
Novellas